Christoph Gottfried Bardili (18 May 17615 June 1808) was a German philosopher and cousin of Friedrich Wilhelm Joseph Schelling. He was critical of Kantian idealism and proposed his own system of philosophy known as rational realism, a view based purely upon "thinking as thinking".

Life
Bardili was born on 18 May 1761 in Blaubeuren in the Duchy of Württemberg. In 1786 he became a  Repentant at the Stift, a Protestant theological college in Tübingen. In 1790 he became a professor of philosophy at the Karlsschule in Stuttgart. After the closing of the Karlschule in 1794, he became a professor of philosophy at the Stuttgart Gymnasium Illustre where he taught until his death on 5 June 1808.

He dissented strongly from the Kantian distinction between matter and form of thought, and urged that philosophy should consider only thought in itself, pure thought, the ground or possibility of being.

The fundamental principle of thought is, according to him, the law of identity; logical thinking is real thinking. The matter upon which thought operated is in itself indefinite and is rendered definite through the action of thought. Bardili worked out his idea in a one-sided manner. He held that thought has in itself no power of development, and ultimately reduced it to arithmetical computation.

According to the Encyclopædia Britannica Eleventh Edition:

Works
 Observationes physicae, praesertim meteorologicae (1780).
 Ueber die Entstehung und Beschaffenheit des ausserordentlichen Nebels in unseren Gegenden im Sommer 1783 (1783).
 Epochen der vorzüglichsten philosophischen Begriffe (1788). 2 volumes.
Volume 1. Epochen der Ideen von einem Geist, von Gott und der menschlichen Seele.
 Giebt es für die wichtigsten Lehren der theoretischen sowohl als der praktischen Philosophie (1791).
 Sophylus oder Sittlichkeit und Natur als Fundamente der Weltweisheit (1794).
 Allgemeine praktische Philosophie (1795).
 Ueber den Ursprung des Begriffs von der Willensfreiheit (1796).
 Ueber die [Gesetze] der Ideenassoziation (1796).
 Briefe über den Ursprung der Metaphysik überhaupt (1798). Kiel
 Grundriss der ersten Logik (1800).
 Philosophische Elementarlehre (1802–1806). 2 volumes.
 Beiträge zur Beurtheilung des gegenwärtigen Zustandes der Vernunftlehre (1803).
 Briefwechsel über das Wesen der Philosophie und das Unwesen der Speculation (1804). Google

References

External links 
  

1761 births
1808 deaths
People from Alb-Donau-Kreis
People from the Duchy of Württemberg
18th-century German philosophers
German logicians
German male writers
19th-century German philosophers